St Helen's Church is a Grade I listed parish church in the Church of England in Burton Joyce, Nottinghamshire, England.

History

It was built in the 13th century. The south aisle dates from 1725. The arcades were rebuilt in 1878 by T. H. Wyatt.

It is in a joint parish with two other churches:

 Holy Trinity Church, Bulcote
 St Luke's Church, Stoke Bardolph

Organ

Records exist of an organ being installed in 1879 by Lloyd and Dudgeon. This was replaced by the current organ dates in 2005 by Principal Pipe Organs. A specification of the organ can be found on the National Pipe Organ Register.

References

13th-century church buildings in England
Church of England church buildings in Nottinghamshire
Grade I listed churches in Nottinghamshire
Helen